In mathematics, the HNN extension is an important construction of combinatorial group theory.

Introduced in a 1949 paper Embedding Theorems for Groups by Graham Higman, Bernhard Neumann, and Hanna Neumann, it embeds a given group G into another group G' , in such a way that two given isomorphic subgroups of G are conjugate (through a given isomorphism) in G' .

Construction
Let G be a group with presentation , and let  be an  isomorphism between two subgroups of G. Let t be a new symbol not in S, and define

The group  is called the HNN extension of G relative to α. The original group G is called the base group for the construction, while the subgroups H and K are the associated subgroups. The new generator t is called the stable letter.

Key properties
Higman, Neumann, and Neumann proved that this morphism is injective, that is, an embedding of G into . A consequence is that two isomorphic subgroups of a given group are always conjugate in some overgroup; the desire to show this was the original motivation for the construction.

Britton's Lemma
A key property of HNN-extensions is a normal form theorem known as Britton's Lemma. Let  be as above and let w be the following product in :

Then Britton's Lemma can be stated as follows:

Britton's Lemma. If w = 1 in G∗α then
either  and g0 = 1 in G
εi = 1, εi+1 = −1, gi ∈ H,
εi = −1, εi+1 = 1, gi ∈ K.

In contrapositive terms, Britton's Lemma takes the following form:

Britton's Lemma (alternate form). If w is such that
either  and g0 ≠ 1 ∈ G,

Consequences of Britton's Lemma
Most basic properties of HNN-extensions follow from Britton's Lemma. These consequences include the following facts:

If  contains an element  such that  is contained in neither  nor  for any integer , then  contains a subgroup isomorphic to a free group of rank two.

Applications and generalizations
Applied to algebraic topology, the HNN extension constructs the fundamental group of a topological space X that has been 'glued back' on itself by a mapping f : X → X (see e.g. Surface bundle over the circle). Thus, HNN extensions describe the fundamental group of a self-glued space in the same way that free products with amalgamation do for two spaces X and Y glued along a connected common subspace, as in the Seifert-van Kampen theorem. These two constructions allow the description of the fundamental group of any reasonable geometric gluing. This is generalized into the Bass–Serre theory of groups acting on trees, constructing fundamental groups of graphs of groups.

HNN-extensions play a key role in Higman's proof of the Higman embedding theorem which states that every finitely generated recursively presented group can be homomorphically embedded in a finitely presented group. Most modern proofs of the Novikov–Boone theorem about the existence of a finitely presented group with algorithmically undecidable word problem also substantially use HNN-extensions.

The idea of HNN extension has been extended to other parts of abstract algebra, including Lie algebra theory.

References

Group theory
Combinatorics on words